Areae is a tribe of plants in the arum family.

Taxonomy 
Areae contains the following eight genera:

 Arum L.
 Biarum Schott
 Dracunculus Mill.
 Eminium Schott
 Sauromatum Schott
 Helicodiceros Schott
 Theriophonum Blume
 Typhonium Schott

References 

Monocot tribes